Ben Holbrook (born April 20, 1974) is an American rower. He competed at the 2004 Summer Olympics in Athens, in the men's quadruple sculls. Holbrook was born in Oconomowoc, Wisconsin.

He won a gold medal at the 1995 World Rowing Championships.

He is married to Danika Holbrook-Harris.

References

External links
 

1974 births
Living people
American male rowers
Olympic rowers of the United States
Rowers at the 2004 Summer Olympics
Sportspeople from Mercer County, New Jersey
People from Princeton, New Jersey
Pan American Games medalists in rowing
Pan American Games gold medalists for the United States
World Rowing Championships medalists for the United States
Rowers at the 1999 Pan American Games
Medalists at the 1999 Pan American Games